G. V. Prakash Kumar is an Indian music composer, playback singer, actor and producer known for his work in Tamil films and a few Telugu films as well. His first film was S Pictures' Veyil (2006) and he gained fame in Tamil films by the early 2010s. He made his debut in acting on 2015 through Darling. He has won one National Award and three Filmfare Awards in his film career.

Early life 
Prakash Kumar is the only son of G. Venkatesh and playback singer A. R. Reihana, who is the elder sister of music director A. R. Rahman. He also has a younger sister named Bhavani Sre, who is an actress and appeared in films such as Ka Pae Ranasingam and Paava Kadhaigal.

Personal life 
Prakash married his schoolmate, singer Saindhavi, in 2013. The couple became parents to a daughter in 2020.

Career

Music direction 
He first appeared as a vocalist on the soundtrack of director S. Shankar's Tamil film Gentleman (1993), composed by his maternal uncle, A. R. Rahman. He has also contributed to some of Rahman's other projects. He had also worked with Harris Jayaraj and sang two songs in Anniyan (2005) and Unnale Unnale (2007).

G.V. Prakash's introduction as a film composer was in the critically acclaimed Tamil film Veyil (2006) directed by Vasanthabalan and produced by director S. Shankar. His music in the film Madrasapattinam (2010), directed by A. L. Vijay was appreciated, especially his song "Pookal Pookum Tharunam".

He went on to win critical acclaim for his music in Selvaraghavan's fantasy action adventure film Aayirathil Oruvan (2009), National award winning Aadukalam (2010) and drama film Mayakkam Enna (2011), which became his third collaboration that featured Dhanush in the lead role. The album's five songs were written by Selvaraghavan and Dhanush, with the pair also coming together to sing the song "Kadhal En Kadhal". The album also included the song "Pirai Thedum", which Prakash sang himself along with his fiancée, Saindhavi whilst another song "Voda Voda Voda", written and sung by Dhanush, was composed in just 5 minutes and recorded within an hour. Rediff.com reviewed the soundtrack claiming that Prakash had "tried very hard to walk away from his comfort zone and provide the kind of edgy numbers Selvaraghavan demands, and has risen to the challenge". Critics from entertainment portal Behindwoods.com cited that Prakash "reiterates his talent once again" and gave a verdict that the album is "intoxicating enough". In late September 2011, a single track "Oru Murai", written by Thamarai and composed and sung by Prakash in R. S. Infotainment's Muppozhudhum Un Karpanaigal (2012) was released. His subsequent releases include the political satire Saguni (2012) and the background score of the Hindi crime film Gangs of Wasseypur. Songs of the movie Darling (2015) were hits. Especially "Vandha Mala", "Anbe Anbe" and "Sattunu Idi Mazhai".This is also the debut film for Prakash as an actor. Prakash's songs in Kaaka Muttai (2015) were massive hits. "Karuppu Karuppu" song was on charts for a few months. "Karuppu Nerathazhagi" was a huge hit from Komban (2015). G.V. Prakash signed his 50th film with director Atlee that is Vijay's 59th, which is named Theri (2016).

GV Prakash's Last two releases as a composer and not his film as an actor are Vetrimaaran-Dhanush's Asuran (2019) and Sudha Kongara-Suriya's Soorarai Pottru (2020).

Film production 
In 2013, Prakash Kumar launched his own production house under the name "GV Prakash Kumar Productions". His first film Madha Yaanai Koottam, was directed by Vikram Sugumaran, a former assistant of Balu Mahendra.

Acting 
In 2012, director A.R. Murugadoss approached Kumar regarding a potential acting venture. Prakash agreed to star in the project, however, the film later failed to take off. He subsequently signed on to appear in three films in quick succession, with the three entering production simultaneously. In order to further his acting ability, he took lessons from actor Aadukalam Naren and has noted that his stage performances as a singer were also helpful in demonstrating his potential as an actor.

Prakash was going to make his acting debut in a film titled Pencil, opposite Sri Divya, where he will be playing a school student. However, as Pencils release was delayed, his first release became the horror film Darling. A remake of the 2013 Telugu film Prema Katha Chitram. Thereafter, Trisha Illana Nayanthara (2015). The film deals with the present day definition of love and the perspective of today's youngsters of both genders about love, relationship, virginity etc. In 2016, he appeared in Pencil and two comedies films Enakku Innoru Per Irukku and Kadavul Irukaan Kumaru. The next is Bruce Lee  (2017). He acted in the climax sequence as cameo appearance with Silambarasan's Anbanavan Asaradhavan Adangadhavan (2017). In 2018, he starred in Bala's action crime Naachiyaar. He acted in second role next to Jyothika. Then the comedy-drama, Semma released on May. In 2019, he had five releases this year with Sarvam Thaala Mayam, Kuppathu Raja, Watchman, Sivappu Manjal Pachai and 100% Kadhal.

In 2021, his film Vanakkam Da Mappilei was a direct to OTT release. It was marks the second collaboration of G. V. Prakash and Rajesh after 2016's Kadavul Irukaan Kumaru. Following Bachelor and Jail were released in December.

Discography
 Original scores 

#Film score by another composer
#2Soundtrack by another composer
Upcoming films as composer

 The films are listed in order that the music released, regardless of the dates the film released.
 The year next to the title of the affected films indicates the release year of the either dubbed or remade version in the named language later than the original version.
 • indicates original language release. Indicates simultaneous makes, if featuring in more languages
 ♦ indicates a remade version, the remaining ones being dubbed versions
Television

 As singer 
Film songsInternational Single'

Independent songs

Filmography

As actor

As dubbing artist

Awards and nominations

References

External links 
 

1987 births
Kannada film score composers
Living people
Musicians from Chennai
South Indian International Movie Awards winners
Tamil film score composers
Tamil musicians
Telugu film score composers
Telugu playback singers
Tamil playback singers
Best Music Direction National Film Award winners